Michael "Mike" Bishop (born September 7, 1968) is an American bassist and vocalist and a member of the heavy metal band GWAR.

Life and career 
He attended Thomas Dale High School in Chester, Virginia. Most notably, he was the bass guitarist and, after a 20-year hiatus, is currently the lead vocalist for the American heavy metal band Gwar. Bishop's first band was the Hopewell, VA-based hardcore outfit The Guilty. As a member of Gwar, he was the first to play the role of "Beefcake the Mighty". The name of Beefcake was taken from Bishop's nickname during his punk years. Bishop was the bassist and lead vocalist for Kepone from 1991 through the band's breakup in 1997. All three members of Kepone later performed together again as American Grizzly until that band's breakup in 2005. He played with the Misery Brothers, a country/soul band local to Charlottesville, Virginia from 2007 to 2009.

Bishop earned a Ph.D. in music from UVA in 2012 and taught writing and topics in American music history at the university, specializing in popular music ethnography and performance studies.

Since 2011, Kepone has reunited to play occasional shows, although it remains unknown if the band will create any new music. Outside of performing, Bishop:
 teaches undergraduate courses in American music history and writing at the University of Virginia;
 is the Learning Strategist and Lead Technical Writer at education technology company Interfolio
In August 2014, Bishop, portraying the character, Blothar, became the lead vocalist for Gwar, replacing Dave Brockie due to Brockie's death of a heroin overdose on March 23, 2014. Brockie had portrayed the role of Oderus Urungus since the band's 1984 inception.

Discography
Gwar
Hell-O (1988)
Scumdogs of the Universe (1990)
America Must Be Destroyed (1992)
This Toilet Earth (1994)
We Kill Everything (1999)
 The Blood of Gods (2017)
 The New Dark Ages (2022)

Kepone
Ugly Dance (1994)
 Skin (1995)
Kepone (1997)

References 

1968 births
American rock bass guitarists
American male bass guitarists
American rock singers
American industrial musicians
Living people
Metal Blade Records artists
Pigface members
Quarterstick Records artists
20th-century American bass guitarists
20th-century American male musicians